Banja Stijena, also Banj Stijena, Ban Stijena (referring to medieval title), or Mračna Pećina, as locally known, is a cave in Bosnia and Herzegovina located in the canyon of the river Prača. The cave has an extensive channel system about 2,000 meters long. It is rich in various types of cave features. It was first mentioned in the early 20th century when constructing a railway through the canyon. Access to the cave was mined during the Bosnian War.

Banja Stijena cave is a special geological reserve.

References

External links 

Coordinates on Wikidata
Rogatica
Caves of Bosnia and Herzegovina
Karst caves of Bosnia and Herzegovina
Karst formations of Bosnia and Herzegovina
Subterranean rivers of Bosnia and Herzegovina
Underground lakes of Bosnia and Herzegovina
Drina basin
Karst springs of Bosnia and Herzegovina
Glasinac plateau